Rutidermatidae is a family of crustaceans belonging to the order Myodocopida.

Genera:
 Alternochelata Kornicker, 1958
 Metaschisma Kornicker, 1994
 Rutiderma Brady & Norman, 1896
 Scleraner Kornicker, 1975

References

Ostracods